St. Amant High School is a high school located in Ascension Parish, Louisiana, United States. It is within the Ascension Parish School Board.

As of the 2018–2019 school year, the school has an enrollment of 2,064 students and 98.0 classroom teachers (on an FTE basis), for a student-teacher ratio of 123.1.

The school colors are black and gold and the school mascot is the alligator. The current principal is Beth Templet.

Freshman Academy

The Freshman Academy at St. Amant High School was added and completed in 2016.

The new $14,078,000 dollar 66,000 square-foot facility, completed by Stuart & Company General Contractors, which features 28 classrooms, a new state-of-the-art cafeteria and theater will be part of the solution for getting St. Amant High back on its campus by February 13, 2017.

Demographics 

Info from GreatSchools.Net

Athletics
St. Amant High athletics competes in the LHSAA.

Notable alumni 
Kim Batiste (1968–2020), Major League Baseball player for the Philadelphia Phillies (1991–1994) and San Francisco Giants (1996). Batiste was a member of the 1993 Phillies World Series team.
Reid Brignac (born 1986), Major League baseball player
Blayne Enlow (born 1999), baseball player
Jason Garey (born 1984), All-American college soccer at the University of Maryland winning the 2005 Hermann Trophy as the best college player in his senior season. Led the Terrapins to the 2005 College Cup (NCAA national champions). Drafted by Columbus Crew in the first round (third overall) at the 2006 MLS SuperDraft, winning the MLS Cup in 2008.
Butch Pierre (born 1962) is an assistant basketball coach for the Oklahoma State Cowboys and the former interim head coach of the Louisiana State University basketball
Andy Sheets (born 1971), is a former shortstop in Major League Baseball who played for the Seattle Mariners (1996–1997), San Diego Padres (1998), Anaheim Angels (1999), Boston Red Sox (2000) and Tampa Bay Devil Rays (2001–2002). Sheets was a member of the 1998 Padres World Series team. Cousin of Ben Sheets (see below)
Ben Sheets (born 1978), professional baseball player for the Atlanta Braves. Former teams included the Milwaukee Brewers and Oakland Athletics. He was a member of the 2000 Team USA Gold medal winning Olympic Baseball Team. Sheets is a four-time All-Star and was the N.L. starting pitcher for the 2008 All-Star game. Cousin of Andy Sheets (see above).
Adarrial Smylie, former basketball player for Southern University
Shannon Stewart (born 1978), June 2000 Playboy Playmate, model, actress
Jason Williams, former Louisiana State University baseball standout and member of the 1996 Team USA Bronze medal winning Olympic Baseball team
John "Hot Rod" Williams (1962-2015), former NBA basketball player selected by the Cleveland Cavaliers in the 1985 NBA Draft with the 21st pick of the second round.

References

External links
St. Amant High School website
Ascension Parish Public Schools website

Public high schools in Louisiana
Schools in Ascension Parish, Louisiana
Educational institutions established in 1978